Type C3 submarine may refer to:

 , also called Type C3 submarine or Type C Modified submarine (Junsen Hei-gata-kai), the first class submarine of the Imperial Japanese Navy
 , also called Type C3 submarine (C3-gata), the third class submarine of the Imperial Japanese Navy

See also
 C-class submarine